A training ship is a ship used to train students as sailors. The term is mostly used to describe ships employed by navies to train future officers. Essentially there are two types: those used for training at sea and old hulks used to house classrooms.

The hands-on aspect provided by sail training has also been used as a platform for everything from semesters at sea for undergraduate oceanography and biology students, marine science and physical science for high school students, to character building for at-risk youths.

Notable training ships

Royal Navy

  from 1874 to 1933.
  from 1904 to 1921 (renamed President in 1911).
 , a 1973 destroyer used for training from 1987 to 2020.
  from 1876 to c.1919.
  from 1860 to 1902.
 Conway, a series of three training ships from 1859 to 1956 and then a shore-based school.
  from 1884 to 1931.
 , a 1955 frigate used for training from 1969 to 1985.
 Cornwall
 , a 1957 frigate used for training from 1971 to 1985.
 , the Royal Navy's first specially commissioned training ship; renamed HMS Worcester after 1945.
 Excellent, a series of three gunnery training ships from 1830 to 1892 before moving ashore.
 , training ship for gunnery from 1862 to 1884, and for boys from 1891 to 1897. See also Trincomalee.
  from 1865 to 1905; continuing renamed Tenedos III, Indus V and Impregnable III until 1923.
 , ex-French Duguay-Rouin (1800) renamed in 1805, from 1855 to c.1949.
 , a series of two training ships from 1865 to 1941, including ex-.
  from 1871 to 1905.
  from 1869 to 1929.
 , a naval training establishment founded as a ship in 1885.
 Mount Edgecumbe, ex- renamed Conway (1861–76), used from 1876 to 1920.
  from 1894 to 1905.
  from 1862 to 1903.
  from 1866 to 1912.
 Trincomalee (1817) from 1860 to 1903, continuing renamed TS Foudroyant until 1986.
 Warspite, a series of three training ships from 1862 to 1940.
 Worcester, a series of three training ships from 1862 to 1968.
 Wellesley
  from 1862 to 1905.

Other navies

 Algerian Navy
 El-Mellah
 Argentine Navy
 
 
 Bangladesh Navy
 BNS Shaheed Ruhul Amin
 Brazilian Navy
 Cisne Branco
 Bulgarian Navy
 
 Royal Canadian Navy
  (sail training)
 HMCS Grisle 
 Chilean Navy
 
 Chinese People's Liberation Army Navy
Zheng He
 Brave the Wave-class
 
 Colombian Navy
 
 Dominican Navy
 
 Finnish Navy
 Suomen Joutsen
 
 German Navy
 , of the Kriegsmarine
 , of the Bundesmarine
 Indian Navy
 , sail training ship commissioned in 2012.
 , sail training ship commissioned in 1997.
 , cadet training ship commissioned in 1986.
 , sail training ship commissioned in 1981.
 Indonesian Navy
 
 
 
 KRI Ki Hajar Dewantara
Irish Naval Service

 Italian Navy
 
 
 Japan Maritime Self-Defense Force
 
 Mexican Navy
 
 Royal Dutch Navy
 
 
 New Zealand Navy
 
 Pakistan Navy
 PNS Babur, ex-, bought in 1956 and used for training from 1961 to 1963.
 , ex-Prince William (2001), bought in 2010.
 Peruvian Navy
 
 Polish Navy
 
 Portuguese Navy
 Dom Fernando II e Glória, 1843 frigate used for artillery training from 1865 to 1940.
 Pedro Nunes, ex-British clipper Thermopylae (1868), intended for training from 1896 but unused.
 The second NRP Sagres
 The third 
 Romanian Navy 
 
 Spanish Navy
 Nautilus
 Galatea
 
 Sri Lankan Navy
 
 United States
 USS Constitution, of the United States Navy
 , of the United States Coast Guard
 , of the United States Navy
 , of the United States Navy
 Uruguayan Navy
 
 Venezuelan Navy

Merchant fleet

 MV Cape Don
 Christian Radich, Norway
 Herzogin Cecilie, Germany
 , France
 , Russia
 , Ukraine
 Kraljica Mora, Croatia
 , Germany, sunk 1957
 , Germany
 , Russia
 , Russia
 , Norway
 , USA
 John W. Brown II, USA
 Statsraad Lehmkuhl, Norway
 , Denmark
 TS Dolphin Leith, United Kingdom
 TS Dufferin (IMMTS Dufferin), British India
 TS Rajendra, India
 TS , India
  of the Maritime Academy of Asia and the Pacific
  of the Australian Maritime College
 MV Stephen Brown Permanently Moored vessel of the Australian Maritime College

United States Maritime Administration owned training ships
 TS General Rudder of the Texas A&M University at Galveston
  of the SUNY Maritime College
 TS  of the California State University Maritime Academy
  of the Massachusetts Maritime Academy
  of the Maine Maritime Academy
 TS State of Michigan of the Great Lakes Maritime Academy
 T/V Kings Pointer of the United States Merchant Marine Academy
  of the United States Merchant Marine Academy
 T/V Freedom Star of the Paul Hall Center for Maritime Training and Education

Other sail training vessels

 , schooner launched in 2006.
 , schooner launched in 1984.
 , launched in 1984.
 Christian Radich
 Dar Młodzieży
 , schooner launched in 1973.
  and Exy Johnson, twin brigantines launched in 2002.
 
 
 Lady Washington
 Malcolm Miller
 
 , schooner launched in 1991.
 
 , 1911 barque used as TS Arethusa II from 1932 to 1940 and then 1945 to 1975.
 
 , ex-trawler (1928) converted to barque (1990s) for use 1997 onward.
 
 , a series of two ships launched in 1971 and 2014.
 
 Stavros S Niarchos
 , barque launched in 2000.
 Tole Mour

In fiction
 PRS James Randolph, an interplanetary spacecraft parked in Earth orbit in Robert A. Heinlein's novel, Space Cadet.
 Betty Jeanne, in the novel Fergus Crane by Paul Stewart and Chris Riddell.
The anime series Girls und Panzer makes use of an overblown application of the term "school ship" by introducing carrier-type vessels supporting federal schools and accompanying living communities.

See also
 Stone frigate
 Moored training ship (MTS)

References

External links

 
School types
Ship types